There are several major university alliances in Taiwan, mostly organized in 2002, intentionally modelled after other university systems. The key steps in such integration may include pooling of resources such as libraries and some co-ordinated budgeting.

Current Alliances

Defunct Alliances
 Taiwan Joint Normal University System (or Taiwan United Education University System, 臺灣聯合師範大學系統) 
 Taiwan University System

See also 
 List of universities in Taiwan

References

External links 
 UST Library
 overview presentation (in Mandarin)

 
System
Taiwan
Education in Taiwan
College and university associations and consortia in Asia